Fragmenta phytographiae Australiae is a series of papers written by the Victorian Government botanist Ferdinand von Mueller in which he published many of his approximately 2000 descriptions of new taxa of Australian plants. Including the plant genera of; Reedia (belonging to the family Cyperaceae), and Acomis (in the daisy family).
The papers were issued in 94 parts between 1858 and 1882 and published in 11 volumes. Though a 12th volume was apparently planned, it was not published. It is the only scientific journal in Australia that has been completely written in Latin.

One of the illustrators of the series was Ludwig Becker.

References

Books about Australian natural history
Florae (publication)
Botany in Australia